Guernier is a French surname. Notable people with the surname include:

 Charles Guernier (1870–1943), French politician
 Louis Du Guernier (1677–1716), French engraver

See also
 Guerrier

French-language surnames